This article lists women married to the sovereign prince of Monaco during his reign. Until 1612, the title was held by the spouse of the lord of Monaco.

Since her marriage to Albert II on 1 July 2011, Charlene has been princess consort of Monaco.

Lady in Monaco

Princely consort of Monaco

Hereditary Princesses
Wives of Hereditary Princes of Monaco who never became Princesses of Monaco
Lady Mary Victoria Douglas-Hamilton, the first wife of Albert I, divorced in 1880
Louise d'Aumont, wife of Honoré IV, divorced in 1798
Maria Aurelia Spinola, wife of Ercole, Marquis of Baux

References

Sources

 
House of Grimaldi
Monaco
Consorts